Alexander Grant (born 27 February 1962) is a Scottish retired football forward who made over 430 appearances in the Scottish League, most notably for Stranraer and Queen's Park. He also played for Ayr United, Clydebank, Falkirk, East Stirlingshire and Falkirk. In a 2006 Football Focus poll, Grant was voted as Stranraer's all-time cult hero.

Honours 
Queen's Park
 Scottish League Second Division: 1980–81
Stranraer
 Scottish League Second Division: 1993–94

References

Scottish footballers
Scottish Football League players
Queen's Park F.C. players
Association football forwards
1962 births
Footballers from Glasgow
Clydebank F.C. (1965) players
Ayr United F.C. players
Falkirk F.C. players
Partick Thistle F.C. players
East Stirlingshire F.C. players
Stranraer F.C. players
Living people
Arthurlie F.C. players